Sabirli can refer to:

 Sabirli, Shamakhi
 Sabirli (horse)
 Sabırlı, Alaplı
 Sabırlı, Ergani
 Sabırlı, İliç